The Ethiopic Lamentations of Jeremiah is a pseudepigraphic text, belonging to the Old Testament canons of the Beta Israel and Ethiopian Orthodox Church. It is not considered canonical by any other Judeo-Christian groups.

Contents
This Ethiopic text, first edited by August Dillmann in 1866, consists of eleven chapters:

See also
 4 Baruch
 Beta Israel: §Texts
 Ethiopian canon: §List of books

Notes

Year of work missing
Old Testament pseudepigrapha
Baruch ben Neriah